Christopher or Chris Dunn may refer to:

Christopher Dunn (computer programmer) (born c. 1956), computer enthusiast
Christopher Dunn (American football)
Chris Dunn (athlete) (born 1951), American athlete
Chris Dunn (footballer) (born 1987), English football goalkeeper

See also
Kris Dunn (born 1994), American basketball player